Centro Universitário Ítalo Brasileiro (popularly known as UniÍtalo), is a private Brazilian university located in the Santo Amaro district of São Paulo.

UniÍtalo offers 18 undergraduate and 27 graduate degree programs. It also offers university extension courses, online courses and language courses.

History

IEPAC, UniÍtalo's sponsor, was founded by professor and Italian immigrant Pasquale Cascino on January 25, 1949.  The university originally only offered typing courses and began offering undergraduate courses in 1972.

In 1994, the institution expanded and moved to the Santo Amaro district of São Paulo. During this period, the university expanded its undergraduate course offerings.

The university began offering graduate courses in 2006. That same year UniÍtalo  was formally recognized  by the Brazilian Ministry of Education as Centro Universitário Ítalo Brasileiro.

Alternative Schedule

UniÍtalo offers classes in several time slots, including nontraditional times, such as 5:45 AM (dawn). Other available class times are 8 AM, 8:50 AM, 1:30 PM, 2:20 PM and 7 PM.

Undergraduate Degree Programs

 Business
 Accounting Sciences
 Nursing
 Physical Education
 Pedagogics
 Philosophy
 Visual Arts
 Geography
 Linguistics
 Social Services
 Theology
 Psychology

Technological Degree Programs

 HR Management
 Marketing
 Financial Management
 Logistics
 Management Processes (Management of Small and Medium-Sized Businesses)
 System Analysis and Development
 Radiology

Graduate Degree Programs

 Educational Law
 Philosophy
 Teacher Training
 Educational Management
 Educational neuroscience
 Clinical and Institutional Psychopedagogy
 Waldorf Pedagogy
 Interdisciplinary Projects and Educational Practices
 Executive Advisory
 Business Consultancy
 Sports Management and Marketing
 Strategic Marketing Management
 Economic, Financial and Accounting Strategic Management
 Strategic Management of People for Business 
 Logistics and Supply Chain Management
 Organizational Psychology
 Executive Management in Leadership for the Formation of Leaders
 Obstetric and Perinatal Nursing
 Health Management: Hospital Management / Public Health / PSF
 Personalized Training Methodology
 Emergency Room and Intensive Care
 Psychometrics
 Mental Health and Psychiatry
 Strength Training: Health, Fitness and Performance
 Personalized Training: From Customer Care to Periodicity
 Water Activities

References

Universities and colleges in São Paulo (state)
Educational institutions established in 1949
1949 establishments in Brazil
Private universities and colleges in Brazil